Jieshou Town is an urban town in Chaling County, Hunan Province, People's Republic of China.

Cityscape
The town is divided into 18 villages and 1 community, the following areas: Jieshou Community, Baizhou Village, Huoxing Village, Miaoqian Village, Hongguang Village, Jieshi Village, Daxin Village, Hepu Village, Gongfu Village, Helong Village, Shanglian Village, Jingling Village, Lianhe Village, Zhuling Village, Jiashan Village, Hejia Village, Huajia Village, Baisha Village, and Cangxia Village.

References

External links

Divisions of Chaling County